Louis Robert (Laurière, 15 February 1904 - Paris, 31 May 1985) was a professor of Greek history and Epigraphy at the Collège de France, and author of many volumes and articles on Greek epigraphy (of all periods, from the archaic period to Late Antiquity), numismatics, and the historical geography of  Greek lands.

Life

Education 

Robert studied at the École Normale Supérieure from 1924 to 1927, was a member of the École française d'Athènes from 1927 to 1932, and taught at the École pratique des hautes études (IVth section) in Paris from 1932.

Teaching 

He was made full professor at the Collège de France in 1939, where he remained until his retirement in 1974.

Writings 

After his retirement he continued to publish on Greek epigraphy with his wife, Jeanne Robert, as co-author, as he had done since their marriage and until his death in 1985.

Selected bibliography 

 Villes d'Asie Mineure, 1935 (second edition, with an ample postface, 1962)
 Collection Froehner, Inscriptions grecques, 1936.
 Études Anatoliennes, Sur des inscriptions de l'Asie Mineure, 1937.
 Études épigraphiques et philologiques, 1938.
 Les gladiateurs dans l'Orient grec, 1940.
 Hellenica, Recueil d'épigraphie de numismatique et d'antiquités grecques (13 volumes), 1940–1965.
 Le sanctuaire du dieu Sinuri près de Mylasa, 1945.
 Études de numismatique grecque, 1951.
 La Carie, II, Le plateau de Tabai, 1954
 Lettres d'un évêque de Synnada, 1962.
 Noms indigènes dans l'Asie Mineure gréco romaine, 1963.
 La déesse de Hiérapolis Castabala, 1964.
 Stèles funéraires de Byzance gréco-romaine, 1964.
 Nouvelles inscriptions de Sardes, 1964.
 Documents de l'Asie Mineure méridionale, 1966.
 Monnaies antiques en Troade, 1966
 Monnaies grecques, 1967.
 Épigrammes satiriques de Lucillius, 1967.
 Inscriptions de Laodicée du Lycos, 1969.
 À travers l'Asie Mineure, Poètes et prosateurs, monnaies grecques, voyageurs et géographie, 1980.
 Fouilles d'Amyzon en Carie, 1983.

References

Sources 

 G. W. Bowersock, 'Louis Robert, 1904–1985', American Journal of Archaeology, 90 (1986), pp. 171–172.
 G. W. Bowersock, 'Louis Robert :La gloire et la joie d’une vie consacrée à l’Antiquité grecque', Comptes rendus des séances de l'Académie des Inscriptions et Belles-Lettres, 152 (2008), pp. 1557–1573.

External links 
 Professeurs Disparus, Louis Robert 
 Hommage by Professor Pierre Hadot 
Hommage by Professor Pierre Hadot (In Modern Greek) 

People from Haute-Vienne
1904 births
1985 deaths
Historians of antiquity
Hellenic epigraphers
French epigraphers
20th-century French historians
Members of the Académie des Inscriptions et Belles-Lettres
Academic staff of the Collège de France
École Normale Supérieure alumni
Members of the French School at Athens
Members of the German Academy of Sciences at Berlin
Corresponding Fellows of the British Academy
Travelers in Asia Minor